The  461st Operations Group is a joint Air Force/Army unit flying the Northrop Grumman E-8 Joint STARS aircraft. The group is assigned to the 461st Air Control Wing of Air Combat Command and is stationed at Robins Air Force Base, Georgia. It was most recently activated on 1 October 2011.

The group was originally activated in 1943 as the 461st Bombardment Group (Heavy) as a World War II United States Army Air Forces combat organization. The highly decorated unit served primarily in the Mediterranean, African, and The Middle East Theater of World War II.

Later activated as a tactical bomber unit by Tactical Air Command in the 1950s, the group was designated the 461st Bombardment Group, Tactical.

Mission
The 461st Operations Group is the only active duty Air Force unit operating the E-8C Joint Surveillance Target Attack Radar System (Joint STARS), an advanced ground surveillance and battle management system. Joint STARS detects, locates, classifies, tracks and targets ground movements on the battlefield, communicating real-time information through secure data links with U.S. Forces command posts.

History

World War II

The group was constituted in May 1943 as a Consolidated B-24 Liberator heavy bombardment group and activated on 1 July at Wendover Field, Utah, with the 764th, 765th, 766th and 767th Bombardment Squadrons assigned. It trained under Second and Fourth Air Forces at several airfields in Utah, Idaho, and California, with group elements undergoing combat simulation training at the Army Air Force School of Applied Tactics in Florida.

The 461st deployed to the Mediterranean Theater of Operations in February 1944, the air echelon flying its B-24's via the South Atlantic route, stopping in North Africa before joining the ground echelon in Italy. It was assigned to the 49th Bombardment Wing of Fifteenth Air Force at Torretto Airfield, Italy, in late February.

The group began combat operations in April, engaging in the strategic bombing campaign against Germany. It engaged chiefly in bombardment of communications, industries, and other strategic objectives in Italy, France, Germany, Czechoslovakia, Hungary, Austria, Romania, Yugoslavia, and Greece. It supported counter-air operations by bombing enemy airdromes and aircraft centers, receiving a Distinguished Unit Citation (DUC) for a mission on 13 April 1944 when the group battled its way through enemy defenses to attack an aircraft components plant in Budapest. The 461st BG conducted Oil Campaign of World War II operations against Brüx, Czechoslovakia; Blechhammer, Germany; and Moosbierbaum and Vienna in Austria. It received a second DUC for a July 1944 bombing of Ploiești despite flak, clouds, smoke, and fighters. Also operated in support of ground forces and flew some interdictory missions.

It hit artillery positions in support of the Operation Dragoon, the invasion of Southern France in August 1944 and flew supply missions to France in September. The group aided Operation Grapeshot, the spring 1945 Allied offensive in Italy, by attacking gun emplacements and troop concentrations. After V-E Day, the 461st dropped supplies to prisoner-of-war camps in Austria during May 1945. During its operations in the Mediterranean, the group suffered 108 aircraft lost in combat, and was credited with the destruction of 129 enemy aircraft. It dropped over 13,000 tons of bombs in over 46,000 hours of combat flying.

The group began returning to the United States in early July. It reassembled at Sioux Falls Army Air Field, South Dakota at the end of the month and was inactivated there on 28 August 1945.

Tactical Air Command

The unit was reactivated as the 461st Bombardment Group, Light and assigned to the 461st Bombardment Wing. It was initially equipped with World War II era Douglas B-26 Invader light bombers. This aircraft assignment was temporary until the unit received jet-powered Martin Martin B-57 Canberras and moved to a permanent base at Blytheville Air Force Base, Arkansas. After three years of service with the B-57s the group was inactivated at the beginning of 1958 as TAC prepared to transfer Blytheville to Strategic Air Command.

Joint STARS operations

The group was redesignated the 461st Operations Group and activated at Robins Air Force Base, Georgia as the operational element of the 461st Air Control Wing in October 2011. The group operates the Northrop Grumman E-8 Joint STARS along with the associated 116th Operations Group of the Georgia Air National Guard.

Lineage
 Constituted as the 461st Bombardment Group (Heavy) on 19 May 1943
 Activated on 1 July 1943
 Redesignated 461st Bombardment Group, Heavy in 1944
 Inactivated on 18 August 1945
 Redesignated 461st Bombardment Group, Light on 11 December 1953
 Activated on 23 December 1953
 Redesignated 461st Bombardment Group, Tactical on 1 October 1955
 Inactivated on 8 January 1958
 Redesignated 461st Operations Group on 1 September 2011
 Activated on 1 October 2011

Assignments

 Second Air Force, 1 July 1943
 Fourth Air Force, 30 October 1943
 IV Fighter Command, 7 November 1943
 55th Bombardment Wing, 5 February 1944
 49th Bombardment Wing, 14 March 1944
 Second Air Force, c. 22 July-28 August 1945
 461st Bombardment Wing, 23 December 1953 – 8 January 1958
 461st Air Control Wing, 1 October 2011 – present

Components
 12th Airborne Command and Control Squadron: 1 October 2011 – present
 16th Airborne Command and Control Squadron: 1 Oct 2011–present
 330th Combat Training Squadron: 1 October 2011 – present
 461st Operations Support Squadron: 1 October 2011 – present
 764th Bombardment Squadron: 1 July 1943 – 28 August 1945, 23 December 1953 – 8 January 1958
 765th Bombardment Squadron: 1 July 1943 – 28 August 1945, 23 December 1953 – 8 January 1958
 766th Bombardment Squadron: 1 July 1943 – 28 August 1945, 23 December 1953 – 8 January 1958
 767th Bombardment Squadron: 1 July 1943 – 28 August 1945

Stations

 Wendover Field, Utah 1 July 1943
 Gowen Field, Idaho, 29 July 1943
 Kearns Army Air Field, Utah 11 September 1943
 Wendover Field, Utah, 30 September 1943
 Hammer Field, California, 30 October 1943 – January 1944

 Torretto Airfield, Italy c. 20 February 1944 – July 1945
 Sioux Falls Army Air Field, South Dakota, 22 July – 18 August 1945
 Hill Air Force Base, Utah, 23 December 1953 – 8 April 1956
 Blytheville Air Force Base, Arkansas, 8 April 1956 – 1 April 1958
 Robins Air Force Base, Georgia, 7 October 2011 – present

Aircraft

 Consolidated B-24 Liberator 1943–1945
 Douglas B-26 Invader 1953–1956
 Douglas C-47 Skytrain 1954–1956

 Martin B-57 Canberra 1955–1958
 Northrop Grumman E-8 Joint STARS

Awards and campaigns

References

 Notes

 Citations

Bibliography

 
 
 
 
 

 Further reading

External links
 461st Bombardment Group website
 The 461st Liberaider, June 2012 (accessed 20 October 2012)

Operations groups of the United States Air Force